Fra Luka Ibrišimović, O.F.M. (ca. 1620 – March 1698) was a Croatian friar, cultural worker soldier and a spy, most known for leading an uprising against Ottoman forces in Slavonia during the Great Turkish War.

Biography 
Ibrišimović was born in either Požega or Sibinj around 1620. He received his basic education from Humanities, Philosophy and Theology in Velika monastery, while he received his higher education in Rome. Somewhere around 1670, while Slavonia was still under Ottoman occupation, Ibrišimović founded a public school in Požega. Most of his work was centered around the town of Požega. In 1680 he was imprisoned by Ottoman pasha of Đakovo under accusations of treachery, but through combination of influence on his powerful friends among Ottoman officials as well as bribery, he managed to get out of the dungeon and thus avoided being impaled on a stake. He kept live correspondence with Varaždin general as well as Zagreb kaptol, whom he was informing in his letters about Ottoman preparations in the region for 1683 Vienna Campaign.

Great Turkish War 

In 1684, after The Great Turkish War was launched, Ibrišimović's confidant Hrelja was captured by the Ottomans while smuggling information to the Christian troops. Both Hrelja and Ibrišimović were subsequently arrested, imprisoned and sentenced to impalement by the Ottoman authorities. However, the punishment was only conducted on Hrelja while Ibrišimović was ransomned by his fellow Francisians. After this, he joined Slavonian christian rebels who were hiding in forests and planned a general insurrection against the Ottomans. Croatian historian Radoslav Lopašić considers that Ibrišimović probably spent his time between 1684 and 1688 among the rebels, since his correspondence in that period ceased.

Battle of Sokolovac 
In early 1689, few thousand men strong Ottoman army crossed again Sava river into Slavonia and besieged Požega. Although there weren't many Imperial troops around to confront the Turks, Ibrišimović assembled local insurgent army which defeated the Turks on Sokolovac hill near Požega. It seems that in Battle of Sokolovac Ibrišimović's rebels ambushed Ottomans in their camp during the night while they were asleep, inflicting them many casualties. Throughout the same battle, local women named Manda, Ana and Kata also distinguished themselves by throwing rocks on heads of Ottoman soldiers as they were passing through narrow ravines and attacking them using sickles, scythes and pitchforks. The victory at Sokolovac earned Luka Ibrišimović nickname "Sokol" (Croatian for hawk).

Later in the same year, as another Ottoman army crossed Sava into Slavonia, Ibrišimović and his men baricaded themselvs in fortified Francisian monastery in Velika.

This was the starting point for the liberation of Slavonia following the arrival of general Makar's army in 1691. After the end of Ottoman rule, Ibrišimović organized the return of displaced people and the building of churches. At the late stages of the war, Ibrišimović also dedicated himself for placeent of newly liberated Slavonian lands under jurisdiction of Zagreb diocese. The liberation of Slavonia coincided with a movement to free Lika and Krbava led by Marko Mesić.

Death and memory 
Fra Ibrišimović died in Požega. The town still celebrates his victory as part of its festivities for St George's Day on 12 March.

References

1620s births
1698 deaths
17th-century Croatian Roman Catholic priests
People from Požega, Croatia
Croatian Friars Minor
Croatian soldiers
17th-century Croatian military personnel
History of Slavonia
People from Slavonia
Date of birth unknown
Date of death missing